Jaëll is a surname. Notable people with this surname include:

 Alfred Jaëll (1832–1882), Austrian pianist
 Marie Jaëll (1846–1925), French pianist
 Jaëll Hattu (born 1998), Dutch professional footballer

See also
 Jael, a woman mentioned in the Book of Judges in the Hebrew Bible